A SPARQL Query Results XML(also sometimes called SPARQL Results Document) is a file stores data (value, uri and text) in XML. 
This document is generally the response by default of a RDF database after a SPARQL query.

See also
 SPARQL
 SPARQL Query Results JSON Format

References

Data serialization formats
SPARQL